Pamphile, Panphyle, Plateae filia or Latoi filia, was the daughter of Platea, or of Apollo (Latous), a woman of the Greek island of Kos. 

It is said that silk was first spun by her. She also invented the technique of preparing a thread from cotton wool for spinning on a distaff. She developed the technique of weaving from cotton thread. 

Pliny the Elder described in 70 BC: "Silk was obtained by removing the down from the leaves with the help of water". He also recounted the legend of Pamphile, who invented silk weaving on the Greek island of Kos.  He said that Pamphile discovered the technique of weaving like a spider's web and that "she ought not to be cheated of the glory of making a silk dress that covers a woman but reveals her charms". Aristotle also associated Pamphile with inventing the concept of weaving silk.

Later Panphyle was mentioned in Boccaccio's De mulieribus claris (XLIV. De Panphyle Platee filia).

Primary sources
 Pliny, The Natural History, XI.26.76

Secondary sources
Allen, Prudence, The Concept of Woman: The Early Humanist Reformation, 1250-1500, Part 2, p. 631; 
 Wax Resist Decoration, An Ancient Mediterranean Art by Associate Professor Dr. Margaret Perivoliotis pp. 10,11

References

Ancient Greek women
Greek weavers
Ancient Koans
Women textile artists
Ancient Greek inventors